Michael Lane Turner (born February 3, 1967, in Monahans, Texas) is an American singer-songwriter. Signed to Warner Bros. Records since 2004, he released two singles for the label, including "Always Wanting More (Breathless)", which reached No. 56 on the Hot Country Songs charts in 2004. Lane signed with Original Signal Recordings in 2009.

Early life 
Turner was born in Monahans, Texas, and attended school in Levelland, which he described as "a place so flat you can watch your dog run away for two days". He received his first guitar as a gift from his parents when he was eleven years old and his father taught him to play the songs he heard on the radio. He attended Texas Tech University in Lubbock, where he was an All-American decathlete. He also played in a band called Diamondback during his time in college.

Singing career 
Turner signed to Warner Bros. Records in 2004. He released two singles for the label—"Always Wanting More (Breathless)" and "Let You Go"—but no album. He also co-wrote Blaine Larsen's single "I Don't Know What She Said".

In 2008, Turner was a contestant on The Next GAC Star, which aired on the network Great American Country. He completed the competition as runner up to winning band One Night Rodeo.

As of early 2011, Lane has replaced Dustin Evans as lead vocalist for the country music band Western Underground, originally fronted by Chris LeDoux.

Lane has continued in the Western Underground tradition as the base player for Ned Ledoux’s band.  Ned LeDoux.

Discography

Singles

Music videos

References 

1967 births
Living people
American male singer-songwriters
American country singer-songwriters
Singer-songwriters from Texas
People from Monahans, Texas
Texas Tech University alumni
Warner Records artists
American male decathletes
21st-century American singers
Country musicians from Texas
21st-century American male singers